= Sangedevarkoppa =

- Village
- Country: India
- State: Karnataka
- District: Dharwad

Government
  - Type: Panchayat raj
  - Body: Gram panchayat

Population (2011)
  - Total: 1,010

Languages
  - Official: Kannada
- Time zone: UTC+5:30 (IST)
- ISO 3166 code: IN-KA
- Vehicle registration: KA
- Website: karnataka.gov.in

Sangedevarkoppa is a village in Dharwad district of Karnataka, India.

== Demographics ==
At the 2011 Census of Indiam there were 200 households in Sangedevarkoppa and a population of 1,010 (523 males and 487 females). There were 147 children aged 0-6.
